William Harper Pease (1824–1871) was a 19th-century American conchologist, shell collector and malacologist. He described many species of Indo-Pacific marine mollusks from the Cuming collection.

He moved in 1849 to Honolulu, from where he continued his research

One of the genera he described and named was the sea slug genus: Philinopsis Pease, 1860

Several species were named in his honor : Favartia peasei (Tryon, 1880), Conus peasei J. Brazier, 1877, Amygdalum peasei W. Newcomb, 1870 and Hypselodoris peasei (Bergh, 1880)

For many years, no image of Pease was known, until a 2021 paper revealed that two  (one shown above) had been discovered in the Bishop Museum Archives, Honolulu.

Bibliography 
 Pease, W. H. (1860). Descriptions of new species of Mollusca from the Sandwich Islands. Proceedings of the Zoological Society of London, pt. 28, pp. 18–36.
 Pease, W. H. (1861). Descriptions of new species of Mollusca from the Pacific Islands. Proceedings of the Zoological Society of London. 1861 pp. 242–247.
 Pease, W. H. (1863). [Letter. On errors and omissions in former communications.]. Proceedings of the Zoological Society of London. 1863 p. 510.
 Pease, W. H. (1866). Remarks on nudibranchiata inhabiting the Pacific islands, with descriptions of two new genera. American Journal of Conchology 2(2): 204-208.
 Pease, W. H. (1871). Descriptions of new species of Nudibranchiate Mollusca inhabiting Polynesia. No.2. American Journal of Conchology. 7 (1): 11-19

Further reading
 H. Crosse & P. Fischer, 1873. Nécrologie. Journal de Conchyliologie 21(1): 99.
 Anonymous, 1960. Pease’s catalogue of books on Hawaii. Hawaiian Shell News 8(7): 4-5.
 K. W. Greene, 1960. William Harper Pease – 100 years later. Hawaiian Shell News 8(6): 1, 4-5; 8(7): 4-5; 8(8): 1, 3-4, 8; 8(9): 5, 8; 8(10): 5, 8; 8(12): 5-6.
 K. W. Greene, 1961. Additional data for your Pease file. Hawaiian Shell News 10(2): 2.
 E. A. Kay, 1965. Marine mollusks in the Cuming collection, British Museum (Natural History) described by William Harper Pease. Bulletin of the British Museum (Natural History), Zoology, Supplement 1: 96 pp., 14 pls.
 E. A. Kay, 1975. A biobibliography of William Harper Pease, malacologist of Polynesia. Part I. A biography of William Harper Pease. Nemouria 16: 1-21.
 W. E. Clench, 1975. Catalogue of the species and bibliography of William Harper Pease. Nemouria 16: 21-50.
 R. I. Johnson, 1994. Types of shelled Indo-Pacific mollusks described by W. H. Pease. Harvard University, Bulletin of the Museum of Comparative Zoology 154(1): 61 pp., incl. 10 pls
 R. I. Johnson, 2002. On the cunning character of a couple of conchologist collectors, Wesley Newcomb and William Harper Pease. Occasional Papers on Mollusks 6(81): 164-173.

References

 2,400 years of Malacology

1824 births
1871 deaths
American malacologists